McComb–Pike County Airport , also known as John E. Lewis Field, is a public airport located four miles (6 km) south of the central business district of McComb, a city in Pike County, Mississippi, United States. It is owned by the City of McComb and Pike County.

Facilities and aircraft 
For the 12-month period ending April 24, 2007, the airport had 10,950 aircraft operations, an average of 30 per day: 95% general aviation and 5% military. At that time there were 21 aircraft based at this airport: 90% single-engine, 5% multi-engine and 5% ultralight.

References

External links 

Airports in Mississippi